The Oklahoma Territory's at-large congressional district is a defunct congressional district that was created by the Organic Act of 1890 and ended with Oklahoma statehood. One delegate was to be sent to the U.S. House of Representatives from Oklahoma Territory.

Four men represented Oklahoma Territory as non-voting Delegates in the United States House of Representatives:

List of delegates representing the territory

References

External links
https://www.ourcampaigns.com/ContainerHistory.html?ContainerID=58937

Territory At-large
Former congressional districts of the United States
At-large United States congressional districts
1890 establishments in Oklahoma Territory